Campo de Mayo is a military base located in Greater Buenos Aires, Argentina,  northwest of Buenos Aires.

 General Lemos Combat Support School
 Sergeant Cabral Army NCO School
 Campo de Mayo Military Hospital
 Metropolitan Military Garrison HQ
 Army Infantry School
 Army Cavalry School
 Army School of Communications
 Army Engineering School
 Army Artillery School
 601 Air Assault Regiment
 601 Commando Company
 main units of Argentine Army Aviation

It is also home for the aviation service of the Argentine National Gendarmerie

History
Development of the base was authorized by a Congressional bill sponsored by the Minister of War, General Pablo Riccheri, and signed by President Julio Roca on August 8, 1901. A site was later chosen northwest of Buenos Aires, for which land was purchased from Eugenio Mattaldi in 1910.

Between 1976 and 1982, during the de facto military dictatorship called National Reorganization Process, there were four secret detention centres inside the base. The most notorious were "La Casita", "Prisión Militar de Encausados", "El Campito" and the "Hospital Militar," where newborn babies were kidnapped from pregnant women among the disappeared by the regime.

The Campo de mayo was also the site of an April 1987 mutiny by Lt. Col. Aldo Rico and executed by men loyal to him known as Carapintadas ("painted faces," from their use of camouflage paint). Instigated despite the passage of the Full Stop Law, which limited prosecutions of nearly 600 officers implicated in the Dirty War, the incident was tantamount to a coup attempt against President Raúl Alfonsín, who successfully stayed the mutiny.

References

External links
 Video Report from the Campo de Mayo trials

Populated places in Buenos Aires Province
Military installations of Argentina
Argentine Army
Military schools
Military installations established in 1910
1910 establishments in Argentina